Gotthard August von Helffreich (tr. ;  – ) was a Baltic German commander of the Imperial Russian Army during the Napoleonic Wars. He was descended from an old Estonian noble family. He served from 1790 to 1823.

External links
Museum.ru

Russian commanders of the Napoleonic Wars
1843 deaths
1776 births
Russian people of Estonian descent